Sir Thomas Graham Briggs, 1st Baronet (30 September 1833 – 11 October 1887) was a Victorian land-owner in the Caribbean with property in Barbados and Nevis.

He was the only child of Joseph Lyder Briggs (1792–1866) and Elizabeth Hinds Briggs.

Graham Briggs owned Stoney Grove Estate, Nevis. 

Graham Briggs was made a Baronet as Briggs of Briggs Dayrell, Barbados on 27 November 1871. The title became extinct with his death. He was a member of the a member of the Executive Council of Barbados.

References

1833 births
1887 deaths